Chanigot railway station (Urdu and ) is located in Pakistan.

See also
 List of railway stations in Pakistan
 Pakistan Railways

References

External links

Railway stations in Bahawalpur District
Railway stations on Karachi–Peshawar Line (ML 1)